Ölziit is the name of several sums (districts) in different Mongolian aimags (provinces):
 Ölziit, Arkhangai
 Ölziit, Bayankhongor
 Ölziit, Dundgovi
 Ölziit, Övörkhangai